Domenic Cassisi (born 22 September 1982) is a former premiership winning Australian rules footballer with the Port Adelaide Football Club, and was the club's 62nd captain from 2009 to 2012. He was recruited in the 2000 AFL Draft with pick 50, and is a member of Port Adelaide's 2004 premiership side.

AFL career

Early career (2002–2003)
Between 2002 and 2003 Cassisi only played 18 games and had restricted ground time despite his excellent game on debut he needed training before the 2004 season arrived.

Career high (2004–2005)
In 2004 his career took a step forward, playing all 25 games and enjoying good form whilst also playing a major role in the club's 2004 premiership win. In 2005 he repeated his efforts, having another excellent year by averaging 16 disposals a game and gathering 57 more possessions than the year before. He also polled third in the club's best and fairest award.

Injury (2006)
In 2006 Cassisi missed seven games due to injury, but found just enough form in his limited game time to uphold his reputation as one of the most important players at the club. However, at season's end he lost his spot as vice captain.

Leadership (2007–2008)
After another excellent season in 2007, Cassisi accepted a three-year deal with the club, ensuring that he would stay with Port until 2010. He also was reinstated as Vice Captain. In 2008 he undoubtedly played his best season, averaging 22.7 possessions and 6.3 tackles per game and finishing second in the club best and fairest (career best). He also found himself being handed the club captaincy from Warren Tredrea, who stepped down.''

Captaincy (2009–2012)
In 2009, Cassisi was named captain of the club succeeding Warren Tredrea and replacing the #25 guernsey he had worn since debut. He finished fourth in the John Cahill Medal in 2009.

Final years (2013–2014) 
Before the 2013 season, Cassisi handed the captaincy to Travis Boak and returned to the number #25 guernsey.

Cassisi officially retired from the AFL on 17 July 2014 and played his final game in a three-point win against Melbourne in round 18.

Playing statistics

|-
|- style="background-color: #EAEAEA"
! scope="row" style="text-align:center" | 2002
|style="text-align:center;"|
| 25 || 6 || 0 || 1 || 15 || 14 || 29 || 2 || 6 || 0.0 || 0.2 || 2.5 || 2.3 || 4.8 || 0.3 || 1.0
|-
! scope="row" style="text-align:center" | 2003
|style="text-align:center;"|
| 25 || 12 || 1 || 2 || 59 || 34 || 93 || 25 || 18 || 0.1 || 0.2 || 4.9 || 2.8 || 7.8 || 2.1 || 1.5
|- style="background-color: #EAEAEA"
! scope="row" style="text-align:center;" | 2004
|style="text-align:center;"|
| 25 || 25 || 15 || 11 || 196 || 137 || 333 || 70 || 56 || 0.6 || 0.4 || 7.8 || 5.5 || 13.3 || 2.8 || 2.2
|-
! scope="row" style="text-align:center" | 2005
|style="text-align:center;"|
| 25 || 24 || 15 || 11 || 219 || 171 || 390 || 77 || 49 || 0.6 || 0.5 || 9.1 || 7.1 || 16.3 || 3.2 || 2.0
|- style="background-color: #EAEAEA"
! scope="row" style="text-align:center" | 2006
|style="text-align:center;"|
| 25 || 15 || 6 || 6 || 141 || 118 || 259 || 58 || 50 || 0.4 || 0.4 || 9.4 || 7.9 || 17.3 || 3.9 || 3.3
|-
! scope="row" style="text-align:center" | 2007
|style="text-align:center;"|
| 25 || 25 || 7 || 8 || 259 || 270 || 529 || 106 || 112 || 0.3 || 0.3 || 10.4 || 10.8 || 21.2 || 4.2 || 4.5
|- style="background-color: #EAEAEA"
! scope="row" style="text-align:center" | 2008
|style="text-align:center;"|
| 25 || 21 || 10 || 3 || 225 || 252 || 477 || 62 || 133 || 0.5 || 0.1 || 10.7 || 12.0 || 22.7 || 3.0 || 6.3
|-
! scope="row" style="text-align:center" | 2009
|style="text-align:center;"|
| 1 || 21 || 8 || 7 || 188 || 282 || 470 || 65 || 160 || 0.4 || 0.3 || 9.0 || 13.4 || 22.4 || 3.1 || 7.6
|- style="background-color: #EAEAEA"
! scope="row" style="text-align:center" | 2010
|style="text-align:center;"|
| 1 || 22 || 5 || 3 || 207 || 261 || 468 || 57 || 176 || 0.2 || 0.1 || 9.4 || 11.9 || 21.3 || 2.6 || 8.0
|-
! scope="row" style="text-align:center" | 2011
|style="text-align:center;"|
| 1 || 13 || 6 || 4 || 129 || 128 || 257 || 30 || 102 || 0.5 || 0.3 || 9.9 || 9.8 || 19.8 || 2.3 || 7.8
|- style="background-color: #EAEAEA"
! scope="row" style="text-align:center" | 2012
|style="text-align:center;"|
| 1 || 19 || 0 || 3 || 185 || 180 || 365 || 64 || 88 || 0.0 || 0.2 || 9.7 || 9.5 || 19.2 || 3.4 || 4.6
|-
! scope="row" style="text-align:center" | 2013
|style="text-align:center;"|
| 25 || 12 || 0 || 0 || 79 || 87 || 166 || 24 || 48 || 0.0 || 0.0 || 6.6 || 7.3 || 13.8 || 2.0 || 4.0
|- style="background-color: #EAEAEA"
! scope="row" style="text-align:center" | 2014
|style="text-align:center;"|
| 25 || 13 || 1 || 3 || 78 || 101 || 179 || 30 || 46 || 0.1 || 0.2 || 6.0 || 7.8 || 13.8 || 2.3 || 3.5
|- class="sortbottom"
! colspan=3| Career
! 228
! 74
! 62
! 1980
! 2035
! 4015
! 670
! 1044
! 0.3
! 0.3
! 8.7
! 8.9
! 17.6
! 2.9
! 4.6
|}

References

External links 

1982 births
Living people
Port Adelaide Football Club players
Port Adelaide Football Club Premiership players
Port Adelaide Football Club players (all competitions)
East Fremantle Football Club players
West Adelaide Football Club players
Australian rules footballers from Western Australia
Australian people of Italian descent
One-time VFL/AFL Premiership players